Rachid Sidibé (born 2 December 1990) is a Burkinabé judoka. He competed at the 2016 Summer Olympics in the men's +100 kg event, in which he was eliminated in the first round by Iakiv Khammo. He was the flag bearer for Burkina Faso at the Parade of Nations.

References

External links
 
 https://olympics.com/en/athletes/rachid-sidibe
 https://www.judoinside.com/judoka/105672/Rachid_Sidibe

1990 births
Living people
Burkinabé male judoka
Olympic judoka of Burkina Faso
Judoka at the 2016 Summer Olympics
21st-century Burkinabé people